The Parnall Plover was a British single-seat naval fighter aircraft of the 1920s.  Designed and built by George Parnall & Co. for use on Royal Navy aircraft carriers, it was ordered into small-scale production but after extensive evaluation, the Fairey Flycatcher was preferred for large-scale service.

Development and design
The Parnall Plover was designed by Harold Bolas, chief designer of the reformed George Parnall & Co. to meet the requirements of the British Air Ministry Specification 6/22 for a single-seat fighter aircraft. The successful aircraft was to replace the Nieuport Nightjar and be powered by a Bristol Jupiter or Armstrong Siddeley Jaguar engine capable of being operated from aircraft carriers or as a floatplane. The Plover was a single-bay biplane of wood-and-fabric construction, fitted with full-span flaps and could be fitted with a conventional wheeled undercarriage or floats (with wheels protruding through the bottom of the floats). The first prototype flew in late 1922, powered by a Bristol Jupiter.  Two more prototypes followed, with the second a floatplane, also powered by a Jupiter and the third a landplane powered by a Jaguar engine. The three prototypes proved to be similar in performance to the competing Fairey Flycatcher, with small orders being placed for both types, ten for the Plover, to allow more detailed operational evaluation.

Operational history
Six Plovers entered service with 403 and 404 Fleet Fighter Flights of the Royal Air Force in 1923, allowing the type to be evaluated in service against the Flycatcher and the Nightjar, which both types were planned to replace. The Flycatcher was preferred, being a more popular aircraft to fly as well as being easier to rig, replacing the Plover in 1924. One aircraft was entered on the civil register as G-EBON and was flown in the 1919 King's Cup Air Race, the Plover retired from the race due to fuel flow problems. G-EBON crashed and was destroyed in January 1929.

Operators

 Royal Air Force
 Royal Navy – operational evaluation

Specifications (Plover)

See also

References

External links

 Parnall Plover – British Aircraft Directory

1920s British fighter aircraft
Plover
Carrier-based aircraft
Single-engined tractor aircraft
Biplanes
Aircraft first flown in 1922